Eddie Harbison (born August 25, 1941) is an American politician. He is a member of the Georgia State Senate from the 15th District, serving since 1993. He is a member of the Democratic Party.

References

External links
 Profile at the Georgia State Senate
 Campaign website

Living people
Democratic Party Georgia (U.S. state) state senators
1941 births
People from Prattville, Alabama
21st-century American politicians